Tigbauan, officially the Municipality of Tigbauan, is a 2nd class municipality in the province of Iloilo, Philippines. According to the 2020 census, it has a population of 65,245 people.

Etymology
The Maragtas Legend tells that in the 13th century, ten Bornean datus or chieftains left their homeland in the island of Borneo. 
In order to escape the cruel tyranny of their king, Sultan Makatunaw, they sailed towards the north in their long boats called balang-hais or balangays. They landed on the island of Panay, in order to live a life of unrestricted freedom.

The ten Bornean datus or chieftains were led by Datu Puti. They bought the island of Panay from Datu Marikudo, the native chieftain of the Aetas or Negritos. For Panay Island, they paid Datu Marikudo with one golden salakot (headgear), and one gold necklace for his wife Maniwantiwan. (The Aetas or Negritos then went on to live in the mountains.)

After the purchase of Panay, it was divided among three Bornean chieftains, namely Datu Sumakwel for Hamtik (Antique), Datu Bankaya for Aklan-Capiz, and Datu Paiburong for Irong-irong (Iloilo). Datu Puti and the rest of the Bornean Chieftains left for Luzon.

The population increased mostly in the Siruwagan area (presently located in San Joaquin, Iloilo), where most of the Borneans settled down.

And so, families from the tribes of Labing-isog and Mangwalis decided to settle elsewhere in Panay. They sailed in their long boats, and followed the course of the rising sun.

They landed on a place which they immediately called “Katigbawan” because of the thick growth of a species of giant grass or tall reeds on this place, known to them in their native dialect as “tigbaw”. The famous Spanish Jesuit Historian Fray Pedro Chirino, SJ, called this place “Campo de Suaraga” (a field of reeds).

The Maragtas Legend identified “Katigbawan”, (a field of reeds) as between a big creek, now known as Buyu-an Creek, in the south-west, and two big rivers in the north-east, now known as the Tacuyong and Sibalom Rivers. (This area being identified and referred to, is occupied by Barangay Parara Sur and Barangay Parara Norte in Tigbauan, Iloilo.)

A form of local government was functioning well in “Katigbawan”, when the Spaniards discovered it sometime in 1575. That year (1575), the Spaniards came from their Administrative Center in La Villa Rica de Arevalo, and established the “Pueblo de Tigbauan”, having shortened “Katigbawan” to its present name—the town of Tigbauan, in the Province of Iloilo.

The Spaniards later transferred the administrative seat or poblacion of the “Pueblo de Tigbauan”, from Parara to its present location.

And so, the town of Tigbauan, in the Province of Iloilo, was named after the giant grass or tall reeds known as “tigbaw” the local dialect, which is a legacy from the freedom-loving Borneans who settled Panay Island. (Note: The “tigbaw” or tall reeds are still growing luxuriantly along riverbanks in the town.)

History

Spanish Colonial Era 
"They call the reed-grass tigbao, and, by derivation, the lands which bear this grass are called Tigbauan; and because the site of this village is close to a great expanse of reedy land on the bank of a beautiful stream, it bears the above name. The village itself was on the same shore, at the mouth of the river—which, as well as the sea, yields various kinds of fish, excellent and plentiful, which I myself have enjoyed in abundance. As they were continually fishing on the beach, usually with three or four nets, they never made a haul without devoutly regaling us with a part of it. Tigbauan has a very beautiful district, with many villages extending more than six leguas along the coast of the sea; the entire district is well supplied with game, fruits, and vegetables, and fish from the sea. The people are very industrious; consequently I always saw them occupied—the men, with their fisheries and farming; the women, with their spinning and weaving. What we accomplished in the two years spent among a people so good and well-disposed towards the Gospel could be told in less time than what we left undone; for, since we of the Society of Jesus were then so few, and had little hope of increasing our number, we did not dare to undertake more than we thought could probably be maintained; and in this we were not mistaken, for at the present day, when at least a dozen ministers are needed, there is actually but one secular priest. For that reason we did not dare to baptize adults or children, except in cases of extreme danger, outside of the chief village (which is Tigbauan) and two or three other outlying hamlets, distant two miles or less."

 -- Fr. Pedro Chirino, Relacion de las Islas Filipinas, (1604)

World War II
Tigbauan was the site where American forces code-named Victorino I, landed on March 18, 1945, together with the Philippine Commonwealth troops under the Philippine Commonwealth Army's 61st, 62nd and 63rd Infantry Division and the Philippine Constabulary's 6th Infantry Regiment to begin the liberation of Panay.  The troops set out from Lingayen Gulf, Luzon on March 14. The 185th Infantry, 40th Division, splashed ashore at Tigbauan, several miles west of Iloilo. There they were greeted by Army Col. Macario L. Peralta's Filipino guerrillas and continued with the Philippine Commonwealth troops drawn up in parade formation. General Eichelberger recalled in his memoirs how the guerrillas stood "stiff in starched khaki and resplendent with ornaments." The strong guerrilla force of 23,000 had secured most of the island' except the area immediately around Iloilo where 2,750 Japanese were ensconced. The 40th Division quickly swept through the Japanese outposts and then drove the Japanese from the city in two days. Again the Japanese withdrew after the initial fighting into the inaccessible mountain jungles. In the fighting, the Americans lost 20 men, the Filipinos lost 42 men, and the Japanese 80. Responsibility for mopping up was turned over to the Filipino guerrillas and the 2d Battalion, 160th Infantry. Some 1,500 Japanese later surrendered at the end of the war. Because General MacArthur planned to stage two divisions from Iloilo for the invasion of Japan, engineers began repairing the local airfield and starting base construction at once.

Geography
The municipality has flat terrain. The plain constitutes approximately 57% of the total area, covering about 6,667 has. along the north-west site of the Sibalom River. Along the boundaries of Guimbal, Leon and Tubungan are rolling hills covering an area of about 1,518 has. The municipality has no forest coverage. The town has two main rivers, Sibalom and Tacuyong River. The first originates from the mountain portion of Panay passing through the town of Leon and snaking through the barangays of Cordova Norte and Cordova Sur, Bitas and Bagumbayan, the western portion of the poblacion and empties into the Panay Gulf. The second emanates from the junction of Barangay San Rafael, Binaliuan Menor, Nagba, Dorong-an and joins the Sibalom River in the Southern portion of the Poblacion. Aside from the rivers, there are creeks and natural springs, which could be a good source of water supply and could also be used as natural drainage.

Of the total 8,889 has., 93.78% is devoted to agriculture and allied activities. Of this area, 1,077 has. are planted with coconuts, 4,554 has. are planted with rice and 19 has. are devoted to fishponds. Around 60 has. located in urban areas serve residential, commercial, and institutional purposes.

Climate

Barangays
Tigbauan is politically subdivided into 52 barangays ("Pob." is an abbreviation for poblacion).

Demographics

Economy

Tigbauan ranks as one of the leading municipalities of Iloilo in fish production in the ten coastal barangays of Barroc, Atabayan, Baguingin, Namocon, Tan Pael, Barangay No. 8, Barangay 9, Parara Norte, Parara Sur and Buyu-an. The latest survey showed that barangays Barroc, Atabayan and Baguingin produced less than 2,000 tons of fish mill and bagoong and were sold to fish millers and poultry raisers in the province.

Culture

Saludan Festival
Saludan came from the word salud. Tigbauan is a coastal town, its sea water abound in different kinds of fish. An excerpt from a book, “The Philippine Islands,” by Blair and Robertson; 1493. 1898; Vol. XII, pp. 217, 219-220 of which Fr. Pedro Chirino related his experience and observations about the town states that, “The village itself was on the same shore, at the mouth of the river, of which I myself have enjoyed in abundance. As they were continually fishing on the beach, usually with three or four nets, they never made a haul without devoutly is regaling us with a part of it.”

Since the beginning of recorded history, fishermen have used nets or woven bamboos to catch fish from the sea or rivers, and in the local dialect they call this salud.

On the other hand, aside from winter resources, our forests, farmers and hills are also abound in rich natural resources.

The book further states that “Tigbauan has a very beautiful district with many villages extending more than six leagues along the coast of the sea; the entire district is well supplied with game, fruits, and vegetables and fish from the sea. The people are very industrious and always pre-occupied the men with their fisheries and farming, the women with their spinning and weaving…” Primarily, their farm product is rice. Whether crude farming ways and tools or modern agricultural machineries are used we use the term salud. In threshing rice using the old method or the modern equipment – kita nagasalud man gihapon. Their tuba is famous for its sweetness and as practiced and tuba ginasalud kang salud, and salud also means the method of catching "hipon" or shrimp ("Salud ta sa Palupadan"). The term was coined by then, Sangguniang Bayan Member Rexfel G. Trivilegio of Barangay Atabayan, Tigbauan, Iloilo. Thus, the Saludan Festival was born.

Adlaw sang Tigbauan

During the first term of Mayor of Tigbauan Myrna M. Torres in 1998, she signed an Executive Order declaring the third Friday of October every as the “Adlaw sang Tigbauan”.

History tells us that because of the increase in population in Sirawagan area (the place where the Bornean datus settled), the families from the tribes of Labing-Isog and Mangwalis sought for greener pasture. Following the course of the rising sun they landed in the place which they called “Katigbawan” because of the plentiful growth of giant grasses known to them as “tigbaw”. This place was said to be Parara by word of mouth handed down from generation to generation, it is believed that the families of Labing-Isog and Mangwalis reached the place when the native feasted for bountiful rice.

To the present time, the season for gathering rice crop is mostly in October. During this time of the year the fishermen also rejoice for a bountiful sea catch. Thus, “Adlaw Sang Tigbauan” is celebrated in October. To make this day more significant, the “Saludan Festival” was launched.

Tigbauan is one of Iloilo's treasure troves, packed with "gems" from more than a millennium of historical significance. With one foot in the past, and the other in the present, Tigbauan allows every visitor a glimpse of its heady blend of architectural masterpieces and natural wonder. The town's 134 years of history are on display when you look.

The town delights in its St. John of Sahagun Parish. Constructed using forced labor under Fray Florencio Martin in 1867, its beautiful baroque facade in rococo finish, gives visitors a glimpse of the community's intense spirituality. The church's remarkable architecture with its façade and tower, survived the ravages of the Second World War and the great earthquake in 1948. Presently, the mystical beauty of its altar depicts heaven and Dante's Inferno; the church walls with the Way of the Cross, all done in intricate mosaics of colored stones is a sight not to be missed. On its churchyard remained a marker of what used to be the site of the first Jesuit boarding school for boys in the Philippines established in 1592 and renowned that time for their liturgical music during church services.

The beach in Barangay Parara was the landing site of America's 40th Infantry Division to liberate Panay and Romblon during the Second World War on March 18, 1945. The same area became the landing site in the 13th century of the descendants of the Bornean datus.

Education

Tigbauan has 21 public elementary schools, seven private schools, five primary schools, 45 day care centers, 10 national high (Secondary) schools, four private preparatory schools, and one Catholic kindergarten school. Schools are encouraged to establish and maintain biological/ vegetable garden and participate in the coastal and environmental cleanup and tree planting.

References

External links

 [ Philippine Standard Geographic Code]
 Philippine Census Information
 Local Governance Performance Management System
 Official Account of WW II US Military Operations in the Visayas including the landing at Tigbauan

Municipalities of Iloilo